In enzymology, an ammonia kinase is an enzyme that catalyzes the chemical reaction

ATP + NH3  ADP + phosphoramide

Thus, the two substrates of this enzyme are ATP and NH3, whereas its two products are ADP and phosphoramide.

This enzyme belongs to the family of transferases, specifically those transferring phosphorus-containing groups (phosphotransferases) with a nitrogenous group as acceptor.  The systematic name of this enzyme class is ATP:ammonia phosphotransferase. Other names in common use include phosphoramidate-adenosine diphosphate phosphotransferase, and phosphoramidate-ADP-phosphotransferase.

References

 

EC 2.7.3
Enzymes of unknown structure
Ammonia